La Puerta is a census-designated place (CDP) in Starr County, Texas, United States. The population was 632 at the 2010 census down from 1,636 at the 2000 census.

Geography
La Puerta is located at  (26.346816, -98.750524).

Prior to the 2010 census, La Puerta CDP gained area, had parts taken to form new CDPs, and lost additional area. As a result, the total area was reduced to 0.3 square miles (0.8 km), all land.

Demographics
At the 2000 census there were 1,636 people, 409 households, and 381 families living in the CDP. The population density was 1,911.9 people per square mile (734.5/km). There were 459 housing units at an average density of 536.4/sq mi (206.1/km).  The racial makeup of the CDP was 97.68% White, 0.06% African American, 0.06% Native American, 0.06% Asian, 2.14% from other races. Hispanic or Latino of any race were 98.72%.

Of the 409 households 64.3% had children under the age of 18 living with them, 72.1% were married couples living together, 14.9% had a female householder with no husband present, and 6.8% were non-families. 6.4% of households were one person and 4.4% were one person aged 65 or older. The average household size was 4.00 and the average family size was 4.17.

The age distribution was 41.2% under the age of 18, 10.7% from 18 to 24, 29.5% from 25 to 44, 12.8% from 45 to 64, and 5.7% 65 or older. The median age was 24 years. For every 100 females, there were 91.8 males. For every 100 females age 18 and over, there were 90.5 males.

The median household income was $16,820 and the median family income  was $17,281. Males had a median income of $15,820 versus $10,385 for females. The per capita income for the CDP was $4,507. About 48.9% of families and 48.9% of the population were below the poverty line, including 44.3% of those under age 18 and 53.6% of those age 65 or over.

Education
La Puerta is served by the Rio Grande City Grulla Independent School District (formerly Rio Grande City Consolidated Independent School District)

References

Census-designated places in Starr County, Texas
Census-designated places in Texas